Raphael Wallfisch (born 15 June 1953, in London) is an English cellist.

Background 
Wallfisch was born into a family of distinguished musicians; his father was the pianist Peter Wallfisch and his mother is the cellist Anita Lasker-Wallfisch, one of the last known surviving members of the Women's Orchestra of Auschwitz. He studied under teachers including Amaryllis Fleming, Derek Simpson and Gregor Piatigorsky, among others.

Career

He is a prizewinner at the International Gaspar Cassadó Cello Competition in Florence, Italy. He has been appointed to the faculties of the Konservatorium Zürich Winterthur and the Musikhochschule Mainz.

Wallfisch has recorded on the EMI, Chandos, Black Box, ASV, Naxos and Nimbus labels. He has made CD recordings of almost the entire cello repertoire, including works by Britten, Finzi, Leighton, Shostakovich, Bloch, Ravel, Busch, Schumann, Zemlinsky, and Tchaikovsky. 

He has recorded a wide range of British cello concertos, including works by MacMillan, Finzi, Delius, Walton, Bax, Bliss, Britten, Moeran, Coke, and Leighton.

Family
His wife is the Australian Baroque violinist Elizabeth Wallfisch. His sister is the psychotherapist Maya Jacobs-Wallfisch. He has three children, Benjamin (a conductor and Hollywood composer), Simon (baritone and cellist), and Joanna (a vocalist).

References

1953 births
Living people
English people of German-Jewish descent
English classical cellists
Jewish classical musicians
Musicians from London
Academic staff of the Zurich University of the Arts
20th-century classical musicians
21st-century classical musicians
21st-century English musicians
20th-century English musicians